Syksey (fl. 1840–1849) was the pseudonym of an American criminal and member of the Bowery Boys. He was supposedly the lieutenant and longtime companion to Mose the Fireboy during the 1840s, often the storyteller of his feats, and is credited for coining the phrase "hold 'de but", a common expression used during the mid-to late 19th century meaning to borrow a dead cigar or to "bum a smoke". He was later portrayed in Benjamin Baker's play Mose, the Bowery B'hoy which performed at the old Olympic Theater in 1849 and later toured throughout the United States during the late 1840s and 50s. His pseudonym may have been derived from Bill Sikes, the sidekick of gang leader Fagin from Oliver Twist.

References

Further reading
Blair, Walter. Tall Tale America: A Legendary History of Our Humorous Heroes. Chicago: University of Chicago Press, 1987. 
Harlow, Alvin F. Old Bowery Days: The Chronicles of a Famous Street. New York and London: D. Appleton & Company, 1931.
Jagendorf, Moritz Adolph. Upstate, Downstate: Folk Stories of the Middle Atlantic States. New York: Vanguard Press, 1949.

Criminals from Manhattan
Gang members of New York City
New York (state) folklore
Year of birth missing
Year of death missing